Michael "Mickey" Bergman is the Vice President and Executive Director of the Richardson Center for Global Engagement. He also teaches as an adjunct professor at Georgetown University's Walsh School of Foreign Service, where his graduate level courses focus on the art of emotional intelligence in International Relations and negotiations. He has pioneered the field of Fringe Diplomacy, an area of global engagement that connects people in arenas typically left void by governments and NGOs. Mickey Bergman has become known as an expert in the fields of Cuba, North Korea, and Myanmar.  Nominated for the Nobel Peace Prize, alongside Former Governor Bill Richardson; Mickey has led his team at the Richardson Center to facilitate the release of more political prisoners than any other organization, including American Student, Otto Warmbier, from North Korea, and Princeton student, Xiyue Wang, from Iran. Mickey creates new political capital by leading Professional Exchange Programs to frontier countries such as North Korea, Myanmar, Cuba, Lebanon, and others. He has worked as Executive Director of the Global Alliances Program at the Aspen Institute. He is also the Founder and President of the Solel Strategic Group (SSG). Mickey has published numerous articles, interviews, and opinion pieces in the New York Times, Washington Post, International Herald Tribune, Boston Globe, Foreign Policy Online, and Huffington Post. Mickey also has been featured as a subject matter expert for television interviews on CNN, ABC, CBS, Fox News, I24news, Global News, and ABC News Australia.

Biography
Bergman is a former paratrooper in the Israeli Defense Forces. Prior to his work with the Aspen Institute and SSG, Bergman served for two years as the Director of Congressional Relations and Senior Policy Analyst at the Center for Middle East Peace & Economic Cooperation.

As president of SSG, the group worked with the Clinton Global Initiative, former Governor Bill Richardson, the Robert Redford Center at Sundance, and the Elders.

At the Aspen Institute, Bergman previously directed programs including Partners for a New Beginning, the Emirates-Aspen Partnership, the North-Africa Partnership of Economic Opportunity, and the U.S.-Lebanon Dialogue. Bergman has published in the Boston Globe, Foreign Policy Online, the Huffington Post, Ynet, Daily Star, Aspen Magazine and the Center for American Progress Middle East Bulletin. He teaches at Georgetown University's Walsh School of Foreign Service.

Personal life 
Bergman is married and has one child. He lives in Arlington, Virginia. He holds a Master of Science in Foreign Service (MSFS) from the Edmund A. Walsh School of Foreign Service at Georgetown University and a bachelor's degree from the University of California, Los Angeles.

References

Living people
1976 births
People from Arlington County, Virginia